The Sărățel is a left tributary of the river Râmnicul Sărat in Romania. Upstream from its confluence with the Furu (Purcel), it is also called Monteoru. It discharges into the Râmnicul Sărat near Jitia.

References

Rivers of Romania
Rivers of Vrancea County